is a district located in Miyagi Prefecture, Japan.

As of 2003, the district has an estimated population of 53,076 and a population density of 385.47 persons per km2. The total area is 137.69 km2.

Towns and villages 
Watari
Yamamoto

Merger 
The towns of Watari and Yamamoto were planning to merge and create a new city under the name of Watari. Watari District would dissolve if the city should be created. However, nothing has yet to occur.

References 

Districts in Miyagi Prefecture